Oliver Fernández may refer to:

 Oliver Fernández (tennis) (born 1972), Mexican tennis player
 Oliver Fernández (footballer) (1983–2012), Bolivian footballer